Sir Seewoosagur Ramgoolam International Airport  (French: Aéroport International Sir Seewoosagur Ramgoolam) is the primary international airport serving the island nation of Mauritius. The airport was previously known as the Plaisance Airport, and has direct flights to several destinations in Africa, Asia and Europe, and is home to the country's national airline, Air Mauritius. Airports of Mauritius Co. Ltd (AML) is the owner and operator of the airport, and the Government of Mauritius is the major shareholder of AML. It is named after Sir Seewoosagur Ramgoolam, the first Prime Minister of Mauritius.

History 

As a part of the defence of Mauritius, in 1942, when Mauritius was a Crown colony, the government started construction of a Royal Naval Air Station at Plaisance near Mahébourg.  This was subsequently handed over to the Royal Air Force at the end of World War II and civilian operations started shortly afterwards.  The operations of the civil airport started just after the Second World War which gave a boost to the Mauritian economy.

The first flight to Rodrigues island was made on 10 September 1972, an Air Mauritius flight from Plaisance Airport to the Plaine Corail Airport (now Sir Gaëtan Duval Airport) at Rodrigues using a Twin Otter (3B-NAB). Later the Twin Otters were replaced by ATR 42-300 and ATR 42-500 twin turboprops.

Later in 1986, infrastructure works were undertaken to accommodate larger aircraft.  Thus, a new terminal was built including airbridges to meet the expected increase in traffic growth, and a car park attached to the new building and customs service for international routes.  The new terminal consisted of two floors and could accommodate up to four aircraft simultaneously via airbridges.

Facilities 
A new passenger terminal was inaugurated on 30 August 2013, and became fully operational in September 2013. The structure of the New Airport Terminal is designed after the "Traveller's palm", a tropical plant that grows on Mauritius.  It is connected to the existing terminal (refurbishment began in 2014) and has a capacity of 4 million passengers. Airport Terminal Operations Ltd (ATOL) is responsible for the design, building and operation of the new terminal building.

The new terminal, which cost US$306 million, is in line with the "Maurice Ile Durable" concept.  Environmental and ecological aspects taken into consideration include using solar energy collected by photovoltaic cells, recovering rain water, integrating nature to the heart of the building, and including thermo-insulated facades to reduce heat gain. The terminal covers an area of 57,000 square meters and is equipped with five boarding gates with airbridges, including one compatible with the large Airbus A380, check-in desks for departing passengers, immigration counters, and baggage carousels.

Airlines and destinations 

Notes
 : Turkish Airlines' flight from Istanbul Airport to Mauritius continues on to Antananarivo. However, Turkish Airlines does not have traffic rights to transport passengers solely between Mauritius and Antananarivo.

Statistics

See also 
 List of airports in Mauritius
 Visa policy of Mauritius
 Visa requirements for Mauritian citizens
 Tourism in Mauritius
 List of the busiest airports in Africa

References

External links 

 Airports of Mauritius
 Civil Aviation Department 
 
 

Airports in Mauritius
Airports established in 1942
Interntional Airport
1942 establishments in Mauritius